Monnickendam Diamonds Limited, with its main offices at Ely Place, London, carries out the business of diamond cutting and the selling of polished diamonds.

Louis Monnickendam 
Monnickendam Diamonds is a fourth generation family business that was founded in 1890 by Louis Monnickendam in Amsterdam, The Netherlands.

In 1914, Louis Monnickendam moved the business to the United Kingdom and established the head office in Hatton Garden, London.

Albert Monnickendam 
In 1920, Albert (orse. Abraham) Monnickendam, the second president of the business, changed the name of the business to A. Monnickendam.

In 1941, the business became incorporated as A. Monnickendam Limited.

Publications 

Secrets of the Diamond, by Abraham Monnickendam, was published by F. Muller Limited in 1941.

The Magic of Diamonds, by Abraham Monnickendam, was published by Hammond, Hammond & Company in 1955.

Queen's Award for Industry 

In 1966, A. Monnickendam Limited was awarded the Queen's Award for Industry for export achievement.

Arthur Monnickendam 
Arthur Monnickendam, the third president of the business, represented the diamond industry in the London Chamber of Commerce and became a member of CIBJO, the World Jewellery Confederation, representing the United Kingdom.

Gary Monnickendam 
In 1995, the business became incorporated as Monnickendam Diamonds Limited.

Gary Monnickendam is the current and fourth president of the business.

World Record Diamond 

In May 2009 Gary Monnickendam cut a 7.03ct Fancy Vivid Blue Internally Flawless Diamond on behalf of Petra Diamonds. This diamond achieved the then highest price per carat ever paid for a diamond when it was sold at auction by Sotheby's in Geneva for 10.5 million Swiss francs (US$9.5 million at the time) which is in excess of US$1.3 million per carat.

Medina House, Brighton and Hove 
From the 1940s to the 1990s the business operated its diamond workshop at Medina House, in Hove, neighboring Brighton, on the south coast of England.

References

See also
Diamonds

Companies based in the London Borough of Camden
Diamond dealers
Design companies established in 1890
Dutch companies established in 1890